Bustelo may refer to:

 Café Bustelo, a coffee brand owned by The J.M. Smucker Company
 SC Bustelo, a Portuguese football club
 "Bustelo", a song by Ratatat  from their 2004 album Ratatat

Places
 Bustelo (Amarante), a civil parish of Amarante Municipality, Portugal
 Bustelo (Chaves), a civil parish of Chaves Municipality, Portugal
 Bustelo (Cinfães), a civil parish of Cinfães Municipality, Portugal
 Bustelo (Penafiel), a civil parish of Penafiel Municipality, Portugal

People
 Carlos Bustelo (born 1936), Spanish Minister of Industry from 1979 to 1980
 Gabriela Bustelo (born 1962), Spanish author, journalist, and translator
 Manuel Barreiro Bustelo (born 1986), Spanish footballer